Tivoli is a popular music venue and cultural center in Utrecht, Netherlands. Tivoli is run by a non-profit organisation. The original organisation dates back to 1823 and functioned as a relaxing place outside the city's Stadsbuitengracht.

Tivoli has two locations: TivoliVredenburg and Tivoli De Helling 7. Tivoli was originally located at Lepelenburg until the venue burnt down in 1979. A new venue opened at Oudegracht 245, which is approximately a 20 minute walk from De Helling. In 2014 Tivoli Oudegracht and Muziekcentrum Vredenburg joined forces in the new TivoliVredenburg, and Tivoli De Helling continued as an independent music venue.

The De Helling location has a capacity of 400 people, and the Oudegracht location had a capacity of approximately 1000 people. Formerly one of the Netherlands' major venues (together with Paradiso, Paard van Troje, 013 and Melkweg), Tivoli Oudegracht was located in the historic premises in Utrecht's city centre, and featured more than 300 productions annually. Apart from pop concerts, there were dance evenings every Thursday, Friday and Saturday and Tivoli Oudegracht was the main concert venue for the Summer Darkness festival for many years.

The Oudegracht location is a Rijksmonument.

In May 2014 Tivoli Oudegracht closed but Tivoli De Helling continued as an independent music venue. A large new venue, named TivoliVredenburg, replaces both Tivoli and the former Muziekcentrum Vredenburg.

External links

 TivoliVredenburg

Dutch culture
Buildings and structures in Utrecht (city)